Todd Bates may refer to:
 Todd Bates (rugby league)
 Todd Bates (American football)